The Aircraft Engineering Corp (Ace) was founded in New York in 1919.

The company was sold to Horace Keane of Long Island, New York in 1920.  In 1930 it was operating in Oakland, California under the name Aircraft Engineering & Maintenance Co.

Aircraft Engineering Products, Inc. operated in Clifton, N.J.

Products
The corporation's only product was a single-seat biplane known as the Ace K-1.

References

Defunct aircraft manufacturers of the United States
Defunct manufacturing companies based in New York (state)
Defunct manufacturing companies based in California
Manufacturing companies established in 1919
American companies established in 1919
Manufacturing companies based in Oakland, California